Protoptilidae is a family of corals belonging to the order Pennatulacea.

Genera:
 Distichoptilum Verrill, 1882
 Protoptilum Kölliker, 1872

References

Pennatulacea
Cnidarian families